Seasoned salt is a blend of table salt, herbs, spices, other flavourings, and sometimes monosodium glutamate (MSG). It is sold in supermarkets and is commonly used in fish and chip shops and other take-away food shops.  Seasoned salt is often the standard seasoning on foods such as chicken, French fries, deep-fried seafood and potatoes.

Australia

Chicken salt 
Chicken salt was originally developed in the 1970s by Peter Brinkworth in Gawler, South Australia to season chicken for rotisseries.This recipe was purchased by Mitani Group in 1979, and is now commonly used on chips throughout Australia.

The first recipe for chicken salt consisted of salt, onion powder, garlic powder, celery salt, paprika, chicken bouillon and monosodium glutamate, along with some unspecified herbs and spices. There are versions of chicken salt that use chicken flavouring as well as vegan versions.

United Kingdom

American Chip Spice 
Invented in the 1970s in Kingston upon Hull and claimed to have been inspired by American seasonings, "chip spice" was introduced into the United Kingdom in the 1970s by the Spice Blender company; the recipe was based on American spiced salts containing paprika. A hot and spicy variant was introduced recently, but was not as successful. The brand is now owned by Wilsons Seasonings.

United States

Types 
Lawry's, the oldest commonly used "seasoned salt" in the US, was originally developed for seasoning steaks in the 1930s.

Morton Season-All is the #2 seasoned salt in the US by market share.

Cajun and Creole seasoning In Louisiana and the surrounding states, many companies make Cajun/Creole seasonings. It is a spicy blend of onion powder, garlic powder, paprika, oregano or thyme, salt, pepper, and chili powder. Brands include Tony Chachere's, Zatarain's and Paul Prudhomme.

Old Bay is a celery-salt-based seasoned salt commonly used on seafood.

Market 

The seasoned salt industry in the United States sells $100 million in seasoned salt annually. According to the US Federal Trade Commission, two brands make up 80% of the market.

The combined marketshare of Lawry's seasoned salt and Season-All was of sufficient concern that the FTC required McCormick, then-owner of the Season-All brand, to sell it to Morton as a condition of McCormick purchasing Lawry's in 2008.

See also

 Bouillon cube
 List of edible salts
 Garlic salt
 Onion salt
 Celery salt

References 

Australian cuisine
Edible salt